The Scheffler Palace is a mansion located at Drottninggatan 116 in Stockholm, Sweden.

History
The mansion was built in the 1690s by the merchant Hans Petter Scheffler (d. 1707). He bought the plot in 1697 and moved in there around 1700. In the years 1875–1876, a renovation was carried out under the direction of  architect Axel Kumlien (1833-1913). The property remained a private residence during the 18th and 19th centuries. The house had a café business, Café Petissan, in the years 1870–1907. Since the 1920s, the estate has been owned by Stockholm University. Johan Adolf Berg (1827-1884), who started a successful civil engineering company,  bequeathed his collection contains art from the 1500s to the 1800s as well as Orrefors glass to Stockholm University which is on display at Scheffler Palace.

See also
 Architecture of Stockholm

References

Other sources
Linnell, Stig. Stockholms spökhus och andra ruskiga ställen..

Palaces in Stockholm
Listed buildings in Stockholm